The Hungarian men's national under 20 ice hockey team is the national under-20 ice hockey team in Hungary. The team represents Hungary at the International Ice Hockey Federation's IIHF World U20 Championship.

International competitions

IIHF World U20 Championships

1980: 8th in Pool B (16th overall)
1983: 3rd in Pool C (19th overall)
1984: 3rd in Pool C (19th overall)
1985: 2nd in Pool C (18th overall)
1986: 5th in Pool C (21st overall)
1988: 6th in Pool C (22nd overall)
1990: 7th in Pool C (23rd overall)
1991: 7th in Pool C (23rd overall)
1992: 5th in Pool C (21st overall)
1993: 3rd in Pool C (19th overall)
1994: 5th in Pool C (21st overall)
1995: 2nd in Pool C1 (18th overall)
1996: 4th in Pool B (14th overall)
1997: 7th in Pool B (17th overall)
1998: 5th in Pool B (15th overall)
1999: 8th in Pool B (18th overall)
2000: 4th in Pool C (22nd overall)
2001: 7th in Division II (25th overall)
2002: 6th in Division II (24th overall)
2003: 1st in Division II Group B (24th overall)
2004: 6th in Division I Group A (22nd overall)
2005: 1st in Division II Group B (23rd overall)
2006: 6th in Division I Group B (21st overall)
2007: 1st in Division II Group A (23rd overall)
2008: 4th in Division I Group B (17th overall)
2009: 6th in Division I Group B (21st overall)
2010: 2nd in Division II Group A (25th overall)
2011: 2nd in Division II Group B (25th overall)
2012: 3rd in Division II Group A (25th overall)
2013: 2nd in Division II Group A (24th overall)
2014: 1st in Division II Group A (23rd overall)
2015: 6th in Division I Group B (22nd overall)
2016: 1st in Division II Group A (23rd overall)
2017: 1st in Division I Group B (17th overall)
2018: 6th in Division I Group A (16th overall)
2019: 3rd in Division I Group B (19th overall)
2020: 1st in Division I Group B (17th overall)

References

Jun
Junior national ice hockey teams